was a district located in Shiga Prefecture, Japan.

As of 2003, the district had an estimated population of 147,928 and a density of 267.90 persons per km2. The total area was 552.18 km2.

Towns and villages
Before the dissolution in 2004, the district had seven towns as listed below. Each municipality is now a part of the city noted in the parentheses.
 Ishibe (Konan)
 Kōsei (Konan)
 Kōka (Kōka)
 Kōnan (Kōka)
 Minakuchi (Kōka)
 Shigaraki (Kōka)
 Tsuchiyama (Kōka)

Mergers
On October 1, 2004:
 the towns of Kōsei and Ishibe were merged to create the city of Konan.
 the former town of Kōka absorbed the towns of Kōnan, Minakuchi, Shigaraki and Tsuchiyama to create the city of Kōka. Kōka District was dissolved as a result of this merger.

Former districts of Shiga Prefecture